Trissernis is a genus of moths of the family Noctuidae. The genus was erected by Edward Meyrick in 1902.

Species
 Trissernis greeni Holloway, 1977
 Trissernis ochrochlora Turner, 1902
 Trissernis prasinoscia Meyrick, 1902

References

Acontiinae